The Pine Island National Wildlife Refuge is part of the United States National Wildlife Refuge System, located on the southwest coast of Florida south of Charlotte Harbor, north of Sanibel Island in Pine Island Sound on La Costa Island. The  refuge was established on September 15, 1908.  It is administered as part of the J. N. "Ding" Darling National Wildlife Refuge Complex.

External links
 Pine Island National Wildlife Refuge

Protected areas of Lee County, Florida
National Wildlife Refuges in Florida
Protected areas established in 1908
1908 establishments in Florida